, often stylized as 5★Star Grand Prix 2022 was the eleventh annual professional wrestling tournament under the Stardom 5Star Grand Prix Tournament branch promoted by the Japanese promotion World Wonder Ring Stardom. It took place between July 31 and October 1, 2022, with limited attendance due in part to the COVID-19 pandemic at the time.

Tournament history
The Stardom 5 Star Grand Prix is a professional wrestling tournament held each summer by Stardom. Similar to Bushiroad-owned male counterpart New Japan Pro-Wrestling with the G1 Climax tournament, it is currently held as a round-robin tournament with wrestlers split into two pools. The winner of each pool will compete in the final to decide the winner. As is the case with G1 Climax, a win is two points and a draw is one point for each wrestler.

Storylines
The show featured professional wrestling matches that resulted from scripted storylines, where wrestlers portrayed villains, heroes, or less distinguishable characters in the scripted events that built tension and culminated in a wrestling match or series of matches. The event's official press conference took place on July 7, 2022, and was broadcast live on Stardom's YouTube channel.

The 20th day, which was also the day of the finals had Masaki Sumitani and Makoto Izubuchi joining the commentary table. Natsuko Tora returned from injury to challenge Utami Hayashishita to continue their feud which abruptly ended at Yokohama Dream Cinderella 2021 in Summer on July 4, an event where Tora sustained her injury. Giulia wins the tournament by defeating Tam Nakano in the finals. The Donna Del Mondo leader challenged Syuri for the World of Stardom Championship at Stardom Dream Queendom on December 29, 2022.

Participants

Qualifiers
Initially, twenty-two participants were announced for the final tournament, (except for the X) with three vacant slots. Therefore, a ten-woman qualification league divided into two blocks was announced to take place to fill the unoccupied spots. The best-ranked wrestlers from each block advanced into the final tournament. Due to Mai Sakurai and Saya Iida finishing the Block B point-tied, they both qualified for the final tournament. The qualification league took place between June 4 and 28.

Final tournament
Being the biggest tournament to date, the tournament will feature twenty-six wrestlers, equally divided into two distinct blocks of thirteen with the two winners of their respective blocks moving on to the finals. The finals of the greater tournament will take place on October 1, 2022. Thekla was originally scheduled to compete but suffered an injury and was pulled from the tournament on July 26, Thekla was replaced by Momo Kohgo.

*Noted underneath are the champions who held their titles at the time of the tournament. The titleholders or even the number of contestants can change over time.
{| class="wikitable sortable" align="left-center" 
|-
!Wrestler
!Unit
!Notes
|-
|AZM
|Queen's Quest
|High Speed Champion
|-style="background: gold"
|Giulia
|Donna Del Mondo
|Winner
|-
|Hanan
|Stars
|Future of Stardom Champion
|-
|Hazuki
|Stars
|Goddess of Stardom Champion
|-
|Himeka
|Donna Del Mondo
|
|-
|Koguma
|Stars
|Goddess of Stardom Champion
|-
|Maika
|Donna Del Mondo
|
|-
|Mayu Iwatani
|Stars
|SWA World Champion
|-
|Mina Shirakawa
|Cosmic Angels
|
|-
|Mirai
|God's Eye
|
|-
|Momo Kohgo
|Stars
|Replaced an injured Thekla on July 26
|-
|Momo Watanabe
|Oedo Tai
|Artist of Stardom Champion
|-
|Natsupoi
|Cosmic Angels
|
|-
|Risa Sera
|Prominence
|
|-
|Saki Kashima
|Oedo Tai
|Artist of Stardom Champion
|-
|Saya Kamitani
|Queen's Quest
|Wonder of Stardom Champion
|-
|Starlight Kid
|Oedo Tai
|Artist of Stardom Champion
|-
|Suzu Suzuki
|Prominence
|
|-
|Syuri
|God's Eye
|World of Stardom Champion
|-
|Tam Nakano
|Cosmic Angels
|
|-style="background-color:#e3e3e3"
|Thekla
|Donna Del Mondo
|Pulled out of the tournament on July 26 due to injury
|-
|Unagi Sayaka
|Cosmic Angels
|
|-
|Utami Hayashishita
|Queen's Quest
|
|-
|Ami Sourei
|God's Eye
|First place of Qualifier Block A
|-
|Mai Sakurai
|Donna Del Mondo
|Point-tied first place of Qualifier Block B
|-
|Saya Iida
|Stars
|Point-tied first place of Qualifier Block B
|-
|Saki
|Cosmic Angels/Color's
|Announced as the "X" on June 29, 2022.
|-

Results

Blocks

Stardom announced the official participants of the two blocks on June 29, 2022.

Notes

See also
G1 Climax
N-1 Victory

References

External links
Page Stardom World

2022 in professional wrestling
World Wonder Ring Stardom shows
Professional wrestling in Japan
Women's professional wrestling tournaments
Women's professional wrestling shows
World Wonder Ring Stardom